Herman Stacy Clardy III (born 1960) is a retired United States Marine Corps lieutenant general who last served as the commanding general of III Marine Expeditionary Force. He previously served as the military deputy for the Under Secretary of Defense for Personnel and Readiness, and before that as the J8 Deputy Director for Force Management, Application and Support on the Joint Staff. He was the 39th commander of the base in Twentynine Palms.

Marine career
From Georgetown, South Carolina, Clardy was commissioned on May 13, 1983 after graduating from the University of South Carolina with a Bachelor of Science in Business Administration. He has a Master of Science in Management from Troy State University and a Master of Arts in National Security and Strategic Studies from the Naval War College.

Clardy's command positions include platoon commander with 3d Battalion, 4th Marine Regiment and company commander in 2d Light Armored Reconnaissance Battalion. He commanded the 3rd Light Armored Reconnaissance Battalion in Operations Enduring Freedom and Iraqi Freedom and 2nd Marine Regiment and Regimental Combat Team 2 during Operation Iraqi Freedom. As a general, he served as the Commanding General of Marine Air Ground Task Force Training Command, Marine Corps Air Ground Combat Center, and as the Commanding General, 3rd Marine Division.

Clardy served in multiple leadership and staff positions throughout his career. He was a tactics instructor at The Basic School and Infantry Officer Course, the Marine Officer Instructor at Tulane University, and the Community Relations Branch Head for the Division of Public Affairs, Headquarters Marine Corps. He served as the Operations Officer of 24th Marine Expeditionary Unit (Special Operations Capable) participating in Operation Joint Guardian and as the Community Policy, Planning and Liaison Officer for Marine Corps Bases, Japan. He was the Director for the Expeditionary Warfare School and the Director of Operations for the Plans, Policies, and Operations Department of Headquarters, United States Marine Corps.

In April 2019, Clardy was nominated to become the next commander of III Marine Expeditionary Force and Marine Forces Japan. With the confirmation of his successor, Clardy has retired from active duty.

Awards and decorations

References

|-

1960 births
Living people
Recipients of the Defense Superior Service Medal
Recipients of the Legion of Merit
United States Marine Corps generals
United States Marine Corps personnel of the Iraq War
United States Marine Corps personnel of the War in Afghanistan (2001–2021)
University of South Carolina alumni